Connecticut's 4th State Senate district elects one member to the Connecticut State Senate. It consists of the towns of Andover, Bolton, Glastonbury, and Manchester. It was represented by Democrat Steve Cassano from 2011 to 2022, when MD Rahman won the Democratic nomination unanimously and then won the November 8, 2022 election by over 60% of the vote.

Recent elections

2020

2020

2016

2014

2012

References

04